Dustin Michael Bergman (born February 1, 1978) is an American former Major League Baseball left-handed pitcher who played for the Anaheim Angels in 2004. 

Bergman attended the University of Hawaiʻi at Mānoa, and in 1998 he played collegiate summer baseball with the Cotuit Kettleers of the Cape Cod Baseball League.

Drafted by the Anaheim Angels in the 6th round of the 1999 Major League Baseball Draft, Bergman would make his Major League Baseball debut with the Anaheim Angels on June 9, . In , Bergman pitched for the Columbus Clippers, the Triple-A affiliate of the New York Yankees, and the Fresno Grizzlies, the Triple-A affiliate of the San Francisco Giants.

Bergman signed with the independent Sioux City Explorers of the American Association on January 4, . On July 16, he was claimed off waivers by the Lincoln Saltdogs.

From 2009 till 2011 he pitched in the German Bundesliga for the Heidenheim Heideköpfe. He now resides in Scottsdale, Arizona where he is a coach.

References

External links

1978 births
Living people
Anaheim Angels players
Baseball players from Nevada
Major League Baseball pitchers
People from Carson City, Nevada
Boise Hawks players
Hawaii Rainbow Warriors baseball players
Cotuit Kettleers players
Lake Elsinore Storm players
Cedar Rapids Kernels players
Arkansas Travelers players
Salt Lake Stingers players
Fresno Grizzlies players
Columbus Clippers players
Newark Bears players
Reno Silver Sox (Golden Baseball League) players
Lincoln Saltdogs players
Sioux City Explorers players
Baseball coaches from Nevada
American expatriate baseball players in Germany